Roland Hennig (born 19 December 1967) is a retired East German cyclist. He had his best achievements in the 4000 m team pursuit, winning silver medals at the world championships of 1986 and 1987 and at the 1988 Summer Olympics.

As a road racer, he won two stages of the Tour de Liège in 1987, finishing in second place overall. In 1988 he won the European Police Championships.

References

1967 births
Living people
People from Hoyerswerda
Olympic cyclists of East Germany
Olympic silver medalists for East Germany
Cyclists at the 1988 Summer Olympics
Olympic medalists in cycling
East German male cyclists
Cyclists from Saxony
Medalists at the 1988 Summer Olympics
People from Bezirk Cottbus